Tarantino, spoken in the southeastern Italian region of Apulia, is a transitional language, most of whose speakers live in the Apulian city of Taranto. The dialect is also spoken by a few Italian immigrants in the United States, especially in California.

History
 
The Tarantino dialect traces its origins into ancient times, when the territory was dominated by the Messapii.

The colonisation by the Greeks founded Taranto not only as the capital of Magna Graecia but as a centre of poetry and theatre. The Greeks had left considerable influence on Tarantino, both in vocabulary and morpho-syntax, and a very peculiar accent that scholars corresponded to Doric. These influences are still found in many Tarantino words of Greek origin.

Subsequently, the city of Taranto became a Roman city, thus introducing much Vulgar Latin vocabulary.

During the Byzantine and Lombard periods, Tarantino acquired diphthongization: the short o changed to ue and the short e changed to ie; moreover, its vocabulary was further enriched with new words.

With the arrival of the Normans in 1071 and the Angevins all the way through to 1400, the dialect lost much of its Eastern influences and was influenced by the French and Gallo-Italic elements. In 1502, the city went under Catalan-Aragonese rule.

In 1801 the city was once again under the dominion of French troops, who left their mark with their Franco-Provençal language.

Taranto has long been linked to the Kingdom of Naples, which would explain some words in common with the Neapolitan dialect.

Samples 
The Tarantino versions are compared to the Italian ones.
'U 'Mbierne de Dande (Claudio De Cuia)

'Mmienze ô camíne nuèstre de 'sta víte 
ij' me scè 'cchiève jndr'a 'nu vòsch'uscúre
ca 'a drètta vije addáne havè' sparíte.

Ma ci l'à ddà cundáre le delúre 
de 'stu vosche sarvagge e 'a strada stòrte 
ca jndr'o penzière me crèsce 'a pavúre.

Ma è tand'amáre ch'è pêsce d'a morte;
ma pe' ccundáre 'u bbéne ca truvéve, 
hagghia parlà' de quèdda mala sòrte.

Ije mo' nò ssacce accum'è ca m'acchiève,
tand'assunnáte stáve a qquèdda vanne
ca 'a vije veràce te scè' 'bbandunéve.

Doppe ch'havè' 'rreváte tremelànne
già 'ngocchie a lle fenéte de 'sta chiàne,
ch'angòre ô côre dè' mattáne e affanne,

vedíve 'u cièle tutte a mmane-a-mmane
ca s'ammandáve d'a luce d'u sole
ca 'nzignalèsce 'a strate a ogne crestiáne...
Inferno – Canto I (Dante Alighieri)

Nel mezzo del cammin di nostra vita 
mi ritrovai per una selva oscura, 
ché la diritta via era smarrita.

Ahi quanto a dir qual era è cosa dura
esta selva selvaggia e aspra e forte
che nel pensier rinova la paura!

Tant' è amara che poco è più morte; 
ma per trattar del ben ch'i' vi trovai, 
dirò de l'altre cose ch'i' v'ho scorte.

Io non so ben ridir com' i' v'intrai, 
tant' era pien di sonno a quel punto 
che la verace via abbandonai.

Ma poi ch'i' fui al piè d'un colle giunto, 
là dove terminava quella valle 
che m'avea di paura il cor compunto,

guardai in alto e vidi le sue spalle 
vestite già de' raggi del pianeta 
che mena dritto altrui per ogne calle... 

'U 'càndeche de le crijatúre de San Frangísche (Enrico Vetrò)

Altísseme, 'Neputènde, Signóre bbuéne,
Túje so' le làude, 'a glorie e ll’anóre e ogne bbenedizzióne.

A Tté súle, Altísseme, Te tòcchene,
e nnisciún’óme éte dègne de Te menduváre.

Lavudáte sije, Signóre mije, appríss’a ttutte le crijatúre Tóve,
spéče frátema mije mèstre sóle,
ca jé llúče d’u ggiúrne, e nn’allumenìsce a nnúje cu jidde.

E jìdd’é' bbèlle e allucèsce cu sblennóre granne,
de Téje, Altísseme, annùče 'u valóre.

Lavudáte sije, Signóre mije, pe' ssòrem’a lúne e lle stèdde:
'ngíele l’hé crijáte lucénde, sobraffíne e vvalènde, e bbèdde.
Lavudáte sije, Signóre mije, pe' ffráteme 'u víende,
e ppe' ll’àrie, le nùvele, 'u chiaríme e ogne ttìjembe,
ca cu chìdde a lle crijatúre Tóve le fáče refiatà.
Lavudáte sije, Signóre mije, pe' ssòreme l’acque,
ca jé ùtele asséje, terragnóle, prizziósa e cchiáre.

Lavudáte sije, Signóre mije, pe' ffráteme 'u fuéche,
ca cu jìdde allumenìsce 'a nòtte:
e jidd’è' bbèlle, allègre, pastecchíne e ffòrte.

Lavudáte sije, Signóre mije, p’a sóra nòstra màtra tèrre,
ca ne mandéne e nn’ènghie 'a vèndre,
e ccàcce numúnne de frùtte e ppúre fiúre d’ogne cculóre e ll’èrve.
Lavudáte sije, Signóre mije, pe' cchidde ca perdònene p’amóre Túve
E ssuppòrtene malatíje e ttrìbbule.

Vijáte a cchìdde ca l’honna ssuppurtà cu rrassignazzióne,
ca da Téje, Altísseme, honn’essere 'ngurunáte.
Lavudáte sije, Signóre mije, p’a sóra nostra morta d’u cuèrpe
ca da jèdde nisciún’ome ca refiáte po' scambáre:
uàje a cchìdde c’honna murè jind’a' le puccáte murtále;
vijáte a cchìdde ca jedde à dda truvà jind’a' Vulundà' Ttója Sandísseme,
ca a llóre 'a secònna mòrte no 'nge l’à ddà ffa' mále.

Lavudáte e bbenedecíte 'u Signóre mij' e dečíteLe gràzzie
E sservíteLe cu grànna devuzzióne.
Canticle of the Sun (Francis of Assisi)

Altissimu, onnipotente bon Signore,
Tue so' le laude, la gloria e l'honore et onne benedictione.

Ad Te solo, Altissimo, se konfano,
et nullu homo ène dignu te mentovare.

Laudato sie, mi' Signore cum tucte le Tue creature,
spetialmente messor lo frate Sole,
lo qual è iorno, et allumeni noi per lui.

Et ellu è bellu e radiante cum grande splendore:
de Te, Altissimo, porta significatione.

Laudato si', mi Signore, per sora Luna e le stelle:
in celu l'ài formate clarite et pretiose et belle.

Laudato si', mi' Signore, per frate Vento
et per aere et nubilo et sereno et onne tempo,
per lo quale, a le Tue creature dài sustentamento.

Laudato si', mi' Signore, per sor Aqua,
la quale è multo utile et humile et pretiosa et casta.

Laudato si', mi Signore, per frate Focu,
per lo quale ennallumini la nocte:
ed ello è bello et iocundo et robustoso et forte.

Laudato si', mi' Signore, per sora nostra matre Terra,
la quale ne sustenta et governa,
et produce diversi fructi con coloriti flori et herba.

Laudato si', mi Signore, per quelli che perdonano per lo Tuo amore
et sostengono infirmitate et tribulatione.

Beati quelli ke 'l sosterranno in pace,
ka da Te, Altissimo, sirano incoronati.

Laudato si' mi Signore, per sora nostra Morte corporale,
da la quale nullu homo vivente po' skappare:
guai a quelli ke morrano ne le peccata mortali;
beati quelli ke trovarà ne le Tue sanctissime voluntati,
ka la morte secunda no 'l farrà male.

Laudate et benedicete mi Signore et rengratiate
e serviateli cum grande humilitate..

See also 
 Salentino dialect
 Neapolitan language

Notes

References 

Languages of Apulia
Dialects of Neapolitan
Taranto